Believing in Better is the second studio album by Lennie Gallant, released in 1991 (see 1991 in music). The album helped earn Gallant Male Artist of the Year from the East Coast Music Awards and also garnered two Juno nominations.

Track listing
 "Believing in Better" (Gallant)
 "Man of Steel" (Gallant)
 "Martyn's Brook" (Gallant)
 "Is It Love I Feel (or courage I lack)" (Gallant/Corrigan)
 "The Hope for Next Year" (Gallant)
 "How Many Bridges" (Gallant)
 "The Cry for Love" (Gallant)
 "Crumbling Foundations" (Gallant)
 "The Stairs" (Gallant)
 "Someone Like You" (Gallant)
 "The Other Side" (Gallant/Corrigan)

Credits 
Lennie Gallant	- guitar, vocals
Brian Bourne - bass, Chapman stick, vocals
Chris Corrigan - electric guitar
Janet Munson - violin, accordion, backing vocals
Tom Roach - drums, percussion, knee slaps
Christine Glen - backing vocals
Hart Rouge - backing vocals
Matt Zimbel - additional percussion
Bill Kinal - accordion, bass

References

1991 albums
Lennie Gallant albums
Revenant Records albums